Amaya (Baybayin: ᜀᜋᜌ) is a Philippine television drama period series broadcast by GMA Network. Directed by Mac Alejandre, it stars Marian Rivera in the title role. The series is set in the pre-colonial period of the 1500s. It premiered on May 30, 2011 on the network's Telebabad line up replacing I Heart You, Pare!. The series concluded on January 13, 2012 with a total of 165 episodes. It was replaced by Legacy in its timeslot.

The series is streaming online on YouTube.

Premise
Amaya, born in the reign of Rajah Mangubat and as the daughter Datu Bugna, she is a "binukot" - a hidden princess and can't step on ground. Born with a twin snake, a secret hidden by his father to keep her away from danger. Due to having a twin snake, her destiny is to become the savior of her land against Rajah Mangubat.

Cast and characters

Lead cast
 Marian Rivera as Bai Amaya

Supporting cast
 Sid Lucero as Bagani
 Mikael Daez as Lumad
 Gina Alajar as Dian Lamitan
 Lani Mercado as Dal'lang
 Gardo Versoza as Rajah Mangubat
 Raymond Bagatsing as Datu Bugna
 Glaiza de Castro as Bai Binayaan/Yang Tersayang
 Ryan Eigenmann as Angaway
 Rochelle Pangilinan as Bai Marikit
 Irma Adlawan as Bai Mantal
 Ana Capri as Agang
 Roy Alvarez as Awi
 Ayen Munji-Laurel as Hara Lingayan
 Buboy Villar as Banuk
 Sheena Halili as Ahak
 Roxanne Barcelo as Kayang
 Mon Confiado as Songil
 AJ Dee as Paratawag
 Robert Sy as Paragahin
 Mia Pangyarihan as Silay
 Ana Feleo as Bayang

Recurring cast
 Angie Ferro as Uray Hilway
 Maybelline dela Cruz as Baylan Asinas
 Diana Zubiri as Kapid
 Dion Ignacio as Kuling

Guest cast
 Edelweiss Tuzon as young Amaya
 Byron Ortile as young Bagani
 Carlo Lacana as teen Bagani
 Francis Magundayao as teen Angaway
 Kate Velarde as young Marikit
 Francheska Salcedo as young Binayaan
 Julian Trono as young Rajah Mangubat
 Abby Bautista as Alunsina
 Yasmien Kurdi as Apila
 Ronnie Lazaro as Posaka
 Daniel Fernando as Atubang
 Juan Rodrigo as Datu Pulahan
 Leopoldo Wendell Salgado as Banu
 Edgar Manuel as Waba
 Jan Manual as Usbog
 Tanya Garcia as Pandaki
 Aubrey Miles as Magwayen
 Pancho Magno as Agul
 Aljur Abrenica as Dayaw
 Rocco Nacino as adult Banuk
 Kris Bernal as adult Alunsina
 Dingdong Dantes as Ferdinand Magellan

Production
The plot of the series, which involved pre-colonial setting, urged the producers to build sets on various locations such as Pagsanjan in Laguna, Bolinao, Pangasinan, and Bagac, Bataan. The scope of the series would require the filming of the integral scenes on-location as opposed to what the producers have done for Encantadia (a television series) a previous high fantasy production which was shot mostly in soundstages. However, to avoid the need for the reconstruction of some of the sets as the on-location shoots are usually ravaged by storms, and also to lessen maintenance cost as well as for the production to avoid acoustic issues by shooting in a controlled environment, they also used the network's temporary soundstages at Marilao, Bulacan for most of the indoor scenes.

The production gave much attention to details with regards to the recreation of historical elements vital to the show's production design. Guided by the academe, they attempted to recreate ancient elements of early Filipino culture from the architecture, to fashion, weaponry and jewelry. Jewels were made in cooperation with the jewellers of Meycauayan. Some textile used in making the costumes were imported from various Southeast Asian countries.

The production also built an ancient warship known as Karakoa. It was made from an existing hull of a modern boat and was redesigned to fit the ancient descriptions of the legendary warship. The production spent more or less Php 2 million for a single unit of Karakoa.

Before the series started, a one-hour primer titled Amaya: The Making of An Epic was aired on May 28, 2011. The show was hosted by Cesar Montano and Miguel Tanfelix, it presented behind the scenes of Amaya from the brainstorming of the management including interviews from Jun Lana and Doctolero, the creative minds behind the story with the guidance of historians from the University of the Philippines.

In September 2011, Aljur Abrenica, Ronnie Lazaro and Yasmien Kurdi joined the series.

Accolades

National Historical Commission of the Philippines and Department of Education
Amaya is promoted by the National Historical Commission of the Philippines and Department of Education due to its cultural concept that shows and depicts the Filipino material culture, beliefs, traditions and mores in the Pre-Hispanic era. It also teaches the history of the Philippines by means of epics and legends passed as oral literature through generations. The show's creators relied heavily on classic Philippine history reference materials such as the Boxer Codex, an early pictographic account of Filipino culture and physical appearances around the time the Spaniards began colonizing the islands. Historical references include the names of the characters in the series, such as Alunsina, from the epics Hinilawod and the Labaw Donggon.

Meycauayan Jewelry Industry Association, Inc.
Amaya was recognized by the Meycauayan Jewelry Industry Association, Inc., an organization composed of 135 jewellers in Meycauayan, Bulacan, for the promotion of the country's rich jewelry-making heritage. Apart from Filipino customs and traditions, the series also features native costumes and jewelry patterned after the popular designs of the era. Most of the jewelries in the series were crafted by jewellers from Meycauayan, Bulacan.

Ratings
According to AGB Nielsen Philippines' Mega Manila household television ratings, the pilot episode of Amaya earned a 26.2% rating. While the final episode scored a 32.7% rating.

References

External links
 
 

2011 Philippine television series debuts
2012 Philippine television series endings
Costume drama television series
Filipino-language television shows
GMA Network drama series
Television series set in the 16th century
Television shows set in the Philippines